The bandolin is a 15-stringed musical instrument in Ecuador. It is used as a rhythm and melody instrument in the Andean region of Ecuador during festivals where dancing and music are involved. It has a flat back and 15 strings in triple courses.

Uses 
In the Andean region of Ecuador, the bandolin is used during the celebration of the feasts of San Juan and San Pedro, along with several other instruments including: twin flutes, guitars, violins, quenas, a drum, a charango, a rondador, and a harmonica. The music and dance that characterize the festival is called a sanjuanito. The bandolines and the guitars mark the 2/4 tempo of the sanjuanito rhythm, which is accentuated by the bombo, and the quenas, rondador, and violins carry the melody.

Construction and tuning

The body shape of the bandolin is similar to that of the bandola, the cuatro, or the guitar, with the caveat that, just as in the case of the mentioned instruments, luthiers who produce bandolins will incorporate into their personal designs changes to the body shape for a variety of reasons. It has 15 strings, in five courses of triple strings, in a guitar-tuning. It has a flat back, metal frets, and a slightly raised fingerboard in the front. The 15 strings run over a floating bridge to a metal tailpiece on the end of the body.

It is tuned E4 E3 E4, A4 A3 A4, D4 D4 D4, F#4 F#4 F#4, B4 B4 B4 or E4 E3 E4, A4 A3 A4, D4 D4 D4, G#4 G#4 G#4, B4 B4 B4.

See also 
Music of Ecuador

References

External links
 The Stringed Instrument Database
 ATLAS of Plucked Instruments
 Cuerda at Pacoweb.net

Ecuadorian musical instruments
Mandolin family instruments